Sweet Movie is a 1974 avant-garde surrealist comedy-drama film written and directed by Yugoslavian director Dušan Makavejev.

An international co-production of companies from France, Canada, and West Germany, the film follows two women: a Canadian beauty queen, who represents a modern commodity culture, and a captain aboard a ship laden with candy and sugar, who is a failed communist revolutionary.

Plot
One narrative follows Miss Monde 1984/Miss Canada, who wins a contest of the "most virgin"; her prize is the marriage to a milk industry tycoon. However, following his degrading puritanical introduction to intercourse, she vents her intention to leave to her mother-in-law who, at that point, nearly has her killed. The family bodyguard takes her away, further humiliates her, and finally packs her in a trunk bound for Paris. She finds herself on the Eiffel Tower, where she absently meets and has intercourse with a Latin singer, El Macho. The sexual act is interrupted by touring nuns who frighten the lovers into penis captivus. In her post-coital shocked state, she is adopted into an artist community led by Otto Muehl, where she finds affectionate care. The commune practices some liberating sessions, where a member, with the assistance of the others, goes through a (re)birth experience, cries, urinates and defecates like a baby, while the others are cleaning and pampering him. Later she is seen acting for an obscene advertisement, in which she is naked, covered in liquid chocolate.

The second narrative involves a woman, Anna Planeta piloting a candy-filled boat in the canals of Amsterdam, the Netherlands, with a large papier-mache head of Karl Marx on the prow. She picks up the hitchhiking sailor Potemkin, though she warns him that if he falls in love, she will kill him. He ignores her many suggestions for him to leave and their relationship evolves. Eventually, in the state of love making, she stabs him to death in their nidus of sugar. She also seduces children into her world of sweets and revolution. She is eventually apprehended and arrested by the police who lay down plastic sacks containing the children's bodies on the side of the canal, implying they too have been killed by Planeta. The film ends with the children, unseen by the others, being reborn from their plastic cocoons.

Cast

 Carole Laure as Miss Monde 1984/Miss Canada
 John Vernon as Mr. Kapital
 Jane Mallett as PDG/Chastity Belt Lady
 Roy Callender as Jeremiah Muscle
 Sami Frey as El Macho
 Anna Prucnal as Anna Planeta/Capt. Ann
 Pierre Clémenti as Potemkin Sailor
 Otto Muehl as Member of Therapie-Komune
 Marpessa Dawn as Mama Communa
 Roland Topor
 George Melly
 Sonny Forbes
 Therese Schulmeister
 Renata Steiger
 Denis Boucher
 Louis Bessières
 Max Fischer
 Catherine Sola
 Hansi Roll
 Berndt Stein
 Herbert Stumpfl
 Sabine Haudepin
 Robin Gammell
 Vivian Vachon

Production
The film was originally intended to focus solely on the experiences of Miss Canada. However, the actress portraying the character, Carole Laure, left the production after becoming increasingly disgusted over the actions required for her performance; she decided to quit after shooting a scene in which she fondled a man's penis on-screen. After Laure's departure, Makavejev re-wrote the script to include the second narrative, starring Anna Prucnal.

Release
The film created a storm of controversy upon its release, with scenes of coprophilia, emetophilia, implied child molestation, and footage of remains of the Polish Katyn Massacre victims. The film was banned in many countries, including the United Kingdom, or severely cut; it is still banned in many countries to this day. Polish authorities banned Prucnal from using her passport over the film, which effectively banned her from entering her native country for a number of years.

Critical response
Sweet Movie received mixed reviews from critics. On the review aggregator website Rotten Tomatoes, the film holds a 50% approval rating based on 22 reviews, with an average rating of 5.4/10.

Home media
The film was nearly impossible to find since its initial release in 1974, but Criterion released the film on DVD in a region 1 DVD on June 19, 2007.

See also
W.R.: Mysteries of the Organism
List of mainstream films with unsimulated sex

References

External links
 
 
 Commentary by Lorraine Mortimer
Sweet Movie: Wake Up! an essay by David Sterritt at the Criterion Collection
  Brows Held High's take on the 1974 film

1974 films
West German films
1970s English-language films
English-language French films
English-language German films
1970s French-language films
1970s Italian-language films
1970s Polish-language films
1970s Spanish-language films
1970s avant-garde and experimental films
1974 comedy-drama films
Films about sexual repression
French avant-garde and experimental films
French comedy-drama films
Canadian avant-garde and experimental films
Canadian comedy-drama films
German avant-garde and experimental films
German comedy-drama films
Films about anarchism
Films about child sexual abuse
Films about pedophilia
Films about food and drink
Films about beauty queens
Films directed by Dušan Makavejev
Censored films
Obscenity controversies in film
Films about rape
Cultural depictions of Karl Marx
Films scored by Manos Hatzidakis
Roland Topor
1974 multilingual films
French multilingual films
Canadian multilingual films
German multilingual films
1970s Canadian films
1970s French films
1970s German films